Commander Harold William Swithinbank  (7 March 1858 – 9 February 1928) was a British veterinarian who served in both the army and navy. He was Governor of the Royal Agricultural Society and Vice President of the Royal Veterinary College.

Life
Swithinbank was born in Newcastle-upon-Tyne, Northumberland on 7 March 1858, the second son of George Edwin Swithinbank FSA LLD (b. 1833) and his wife Constantia Anne Briggs.

He trained as a veterinarian but had a largely military career beginning as a Lieutenant in the 11th Hussars, then as a Captain in the Middlesex Yeomanry (Cavalry section).

Swithinbank served as Justice of the Peace for Buckinghamshire and in 1891 was High Sheriff. He lived most of his later life at Denham Court in Denham, Buckinghamshire and was later Deputy Lieutenant of Buckinghamshire.

In 1905, Swithinbank was elected a Fellow of the Royal Society of Edinburgh. His proposers were Sir German Sims Woodhead, George Newman, Diarmid Noel Paton, and Daniel John Cunningham.

In the First World War, he served as a Commander in the Royal Navy Reserve.

Swithinbank died at sea on 9 February 1928 and was buried at sea.

Family
In 1883, Swithinbank married Amy Eno (1855-1942), the daughter of James Crossley Eno of Dulwich (famed for Eno's Liver Salts) in Camberwell, London. They had one son, Crossley Swithinbank (1884-1949), and two daughters, Enid (b. 1887) and Isobel (1891-1979). Isobel married Sir Stafford Cripps, becoming Dame Isobel Cripps.

Publications
British Sea Fish: An Illustrated Handbook of the Edible Sea Fishes of the British Isles (1900), with George E. Bullen.
Bacteriology of Milk (1903), with Sir George Newman.

References

1858 births
1928 deaths
People from Newcastle upon Tyne
11th Hussars officers
English veterinarians
Fellows of the Royal Society
Fellows of the Royal Society of Edinburgh
Burials at sea
Middlesex Yeomanry officers
Royal Navy officers of World War I
Military personnel from Newcastle upon Tyne